Gridiron was a steamboat landing and woodyard on the lower Colorado River in Sonora state of northwestern Mexico,. 

It supplied fuel wood to heat the steam boilers of the shipping steamboats on the Colorado River from 1854 to the late 1870s.

Geography

See also

References

Former populated places in San Luis Río Colorado Municipality, Sonora
Communities in the Lower Colorado River Valley
Steamboat transport on the Colorado River
Populated places established in 1854
1854 establishments in Mexico